Global Underground 023: James Lavelle, Barcelona is a DJ mix album in the Global Underground series, compiled and mixed by James Lavelle.  The album is mainly breaks and trip hop, which is far different from the progressive house of other albums in the Global Underground series.  The album reached #19 on the Billboard Top Electronic Albums chart.

Throwing another curveball to those who liked to brand GU as the preserve of the prog brigade, UNKLE man James Lavelle drops an astounding mix of breaks and tripped out beats of the kind that crowds in Barcelona continue to love him for.

As an incendiary concoction it was hugely effective, provoking the now customary GU forum exchanges. Many were astounded by the gutsy use of such diverse material while some found it too challenging. But the heady brew was a success, and set up Mr. Lavelle as another regular favourite for the GU stable.

Track listing

Disc one
UNKLESOUNDS - 1-3 AM Intro, Pt. 1  – 1:50
DJ Shadow - Mongrel Meets His Maker  – 4:16
Leftfield feat Roots Manuva - Dusted  – 4:18
Thomas Bangalter - Night Beats/Cheech - Mardi Gras  – 2:02
Yazmin Sotero - The Vibe  – 3:29
Layo & Bushwacka! - Let the Good Times Roll  – 7:29
Sasha - Fundamental  – 6:59
Force Mass Motion & Dylan Rhymes - Hold Back  – 6:44
Evil Nine - Crooked  – 5:27
Stir Fry - Breakin' on the Street (False Prophet Remix)  – 5:05
Jeff Iise - No Soul (PMT Mix)  – 6:32
The Drumattic Twins - Invincible Bass  – 3:23
Layo & Bushwacka! - Shining Through  – 5:48
Ian Brown - F.E.A.R. (Unklesounds GU Fear-Edit, Pt. 1)  – 5:38

Disc two
UNKLESOUNDS - 3-5 AM Intro, Pt. 2  – 1:34
Pitch Black - Underground Sound/Antranig & Pons - Do It to Me (DJ Tool 3)/Eddie Amador - The Funk (King Unique's Speech-apella) – 5:19
Kybosh - Revolution (Dub)  – 4:43
Rennie Pilgrem & Meat Katie - Atmosphere  – 3:52
Meat Katie - Next Life  – 4:13
Soul of Man - Dirty Waltzer  – 3:40
Überzone & Rennie Pilgrem - Black Widow (V.I.P. Remix)  – 2:54
Dead Prez - Hip Hop (Unklesounds Fabric-Edit)  – 3:50
Peace Division - On the Bandwagon (Beating Their Drums)  – 4:05
Duncan Gray - Ultra Savant  – 2:43
Phil Kieran - Juicy  – 3:36
Lee Burridge - Lost  – 4:27
Halo Varga - Dark Clouds  – 4:59
FC Kahuna - Glitterball  – 4:57
Hybrid - Gravastar  – 6:31
Smithmonger - Vodka  – 4:51
Doves - There Goes the Fear (Unklesounds GU Fear-Edit, Pt. 2)  – 6:36

References

External links 

Global Underground
2002 compilation albums